The Metropolitan Collegiate Summer Baseball League of Illinois is a collegiate summer baseball league consisting of eight teams based in Illinois. Formed in 1978, the league is affiliated within the National Amateur Baseball Federation. The majority of the teams are located in the Chicago, Illinois metropolitan area.

League Notes
The Metropolitan Collegiate Summer Baseball League of Illinois (MCBSI) is nicknamed the  "Metro League." Founded in 1978, the League was originally named the Metro Thoroughbred League of Illinois, before the league name was changed in 1987 to Metropolitan Collegiate Summer Baseball League of Illinois.

The league notes that: "College players, home for the summer, can enjoy their families and friends, together with participating in a good competitive league. Official Major League (American League) rules are used with the exception of mandatory use of double ear flap helmets and college safety slide rule. The league has used wood bats since 1992."

The Metropolitan Collegiate Summer Baseball League of Illinois plays an annual All-Star game against the Chicago Suburban League All-Stars. The 2018 All-Star Game was played at Hoffer Field on Judson University’s campus in Elgin, Illinois.

The league included the following eight teams for 2019: Crystal Lake Cardinals, Force Elite Baseball, Kane County Phantoms, Wheaton White Sox, Chicago Mudcats, Illinois Indians, Illinois Cardinals, Windy City Prospects.

Notable alumni

References

External links 
 
  

Summer baseball leagues
College sports in Illinois
College baseball leagues in the United States
Sports leagues established in 2009
2009 establishments in the United States